WPFR is a Christian radio station licensed to Terre Haute, Indiana, broadcasting on 1480 kHz AM.  The station is owned by American Hope Communications.

History
The station began broadcasting January 6, 1948, and originally held the call letters WTHI. The station ran 1,000 watts 24 hours a day. In 1970, the station's daytime power was increased to 5,000 watts. WTHI AM 1480, along with WTHI-FM, and WTHI-TV were long owned by Tony Hulman, and remained in his family's hands until 1998, when all three stations were sold to Emmis Communications.

WTHI aired a Top 40 format from the mid-1960s until January 1974, when the station adopted a country music format. By 1983, the station had adopted a MOR format. By 1988, the station had begun airing an oldies format. By 1991, the station had returned to airing a country music format, simulcasting 99.9 WTHI-FM.

The station adopted a news-talk format in 1992. As a news-talk station, WTHI was Terre Haute's home for prominent national personalities such as Rush Limbaugh and Paul Harvey, as well as The Bob & Tom Show. The station also carried The Mike Pence Show, a statewide talk show which Pence hosted prior to his election to congress.

In 2000, the station was donated to Word Power, Inc., and its call sign was changed to WPFR, with the station adopting a Christian format. The station was taken off the air in March 2020.

In 2021, it was sold to American Hope Communications, along with WKZI, WLHW, WPFR-FM, and three translators, for $179,000.

References

External links

PFR
PFR
Moody Radio affiliate stations
Radio stations established in 1948
1948 establishments in Indiana